A total of 64 Indian shooters participated in the 2016 Asian Olympic Shooting Qualifying Tournament held in Dr. Karni Singh Shooting Range, New Delhi. India ranked 5th in the medal list.

A total of 4 quotas have been obtained in three different events till 1 February.

Participants

Men

Women

Quota Obtained

References 

2016 in Indian sport
Asian Olympic Shooting
Shooting sports in India